Several ships of the Brazilian Navy have been named Mariz e Barros:

 , launched in 1866 and stricken in 1897
 , a  launched in 1940 and stricken in 1972
 , a  acquired from the United States in 1973 and expended as a target in 2000

Brazilian Navy ship names